Yeli Renrong (died 1042) was a scholar and official who served in the court of the Western Xia dynasty of China. He was a trusted official of the Western Xia founder Emperor Jingzong. According to the official History of Song, the Emperor Ningzong commanded him to design the complex Tangut script in 1036 or 1038, based on Chinese writing, for use in writing the Tangut language.

References

Biography in Chinese

Creators of writing systems
Western Xia people
11th-century Tangut people